Ride 'em High is a 1927 American silent Western film directed by Richard Thorpe and starring Buddy Roosevelt, Olive Hasbrouck and George Magrill.

Cast
 Buddy Roosevelt as Jim Demming 
 Olive Hasbrouck as Betty Allen 
 George Magrill as Paul Fisher 
 Charles K. French as Bill Demming 
 Robert Homans as Rufus Allen

References

Bibliography
 Langman, Larry. A Guide to Silent Westerns. Greenwood Publishing Group, 1992.

External links
 

1927 films
1927 Western (genre) films
1920s English-language films
American black-and-white films
Pathé Exchange films
Films directed by Richard Thorpe
Silent American Western (genre) films
1920s American films